Réginald Ray (born 31 October 1968) is a French football manager and former player. He has served as assistant manager of both Aston Villa in the Premier League and Bastia. He is currently the manager of French club Le Mans.

Club career
Ray spent the majority of his 15-year career in the French lower divisions. In 1991, while playing in the Championnat National with Montceau, he was the league's top scorer. Ray was top scorer again in 1998, this time in Ligue 2 while playing for Le Mans.

Managerial career
In 2008, Ray became the under-21 manager for Boulogne. As well as managing the under-21s, Ray also helped coach the team's strikers. In 2010, after two years at Boulogne, he left the club in order to become assistant manager to Frédéric Hantz at Bastia.

On 1 November 2015, it was reported that former Lyon manager Rémi Garde was on the verge of becoming the new manager of Aston Villa, and after unsuccessful attempts to bring his former coaching staff with him, would be appointing Ray as his assistant manager. On 1 April 2016, a club statement stated Ray had left Aston Villa.

Ray returned to manage Bastia in June 2017.

In October 2017, Ray became new manager of Valenciennes. He left after two seasons at the end of his contract.

In March 2020, he was appointed manager of Le Mans. He was released from duties when the club were relegated at the end of the 2019–20 Ligue 2 season.

Honours
Istres
Coupe de Provence: 1993

Guingamp
UEFA Intertoto Cup: 1996

Individual
Division 3 top scorer: 1990–91
Division 2 top scorer: 1997–98

References

External links

1968 births
Living people
French footballers
FC Montceau Bourgogne players
Ligue 2 players
Championnat National players
FC Istres players
Stade Briochin players
FC Gueugnon players
Le Mans FC players
LB Châteauroux players
AS Beauvais Oise players
Nîmes Olympique players
En Avant Guingamp players
SC Bastia non-playing staff
Aston Villa F.C. non-playing staff
Paris FC managers
SC Bastia managers
Valenciennes FC managers
Le Mans FC managers
Ligue 2 managers
Association football forwards
French football managers
Sportspeople from Pas-de-Calais
People from Cucq
Footballers from Hauts-de-France
Association football coaches
French expatriate sportspeople in England